The Five Nations XV v Overseas Unions XV was a rugby union match played on Saturday, 19 April 1986 to commemorate the centenary of the International Rugby Football Board. The Five Nations XV featured players from England, France, Ireland, Scotland, and Wales who had played in the 1986 Five Nations Championship. The Overseas Unions XV was effectively a World XV and featured players from Australia, New Zealand, and South Africa. The Overseas Unions XV won the match 32–15.  Controversially, the squad included a number of white South Africans at a time when the relationship of rugby union and apartheid was being questioned at high levels.

The match
Unlike the British Lions v World XV three days earlier in a wet Cardiff Arms Park, this game was played in ideal conditions at Twickenham. At the time, there were only eight Unions affiliated to the Board, thus only players from those unions were chosen.

Five Nations XV: Serge Blanco; Trevor Ringland, Philippe Sella, Mike Kiernan, Rory Underwood; Malcolm Dacey, Richard Hill; Jeff Whitefoot, Steve Brain, Iain Milne, Jean Condom, Donal Lenihan (captain), John Jeffrey, Iain Paxton, Laurent Rodriguez
 Jacques Fouroux (Coach) 
 Clive Rowlands (Manager)  

Overseas Unions XV: Roger Gould; John Kirwan, Danie Gerber, Warwick Taylor, Carel du Plessis; Naas Botha, Dave Loveridge; Enrique Rodriguez, A G Dalton (captain), Flippie van der Merwe, Steve Cutler, Andy Haden, Simon Poidevin, Steve Tuynman, Mark Shaw
Replacements
Andrew Slack (not named in programme, but Wayne Smith of New Zealand was) 
Michael Lynagh 
Nick Farr-Jones 
Murray Mexted 
Schalk Burger 
Flippie van der Merwe (named in starting line-up in programme instead of Knight)
Tom Lawton 
 Brian Lochore  (Coach)
 Bob Templeton  (Manager)

See also
 British Lions v World XV
 World XV

References
 Starmer-Smith, Nigel (ed) Rugby – A Way of Life, An Illustrated History of Rugby (Lennard Books, 1986 )

Six Nations Championship
1985–86 in British rugby union
1985–86 in French rugby union
1985–86 in Irish rugby union
1985–86 in Welsh rugby union
1985–86 in Scottish rugby union
1986 in Australian rugby union
1986 in New Zealand rugby union
1986 in South African rugby union
World XV matches
Rugby union and apartheid